Tachytrechus is a genus of long-legged flies in the family Dolichopodidae.

Species
These 152 species are members of the genus Tachytrechus.

 Tachytrechus abdominalis (Aldrich, 1902) c g 
 Tachytrechus alatus (Becker, 1922) c g 
 Tachytrechus albinus (Becker, 1922) c g 
 Tachytrechus albitalus (Van Duzee, 1929) c g 
 Tachytrechus albiterminalis Van Duzee, 1930 c g 
 Tachytrechus albonotatus (Loew, 1864) i c g 
 Tachytrechus albopilosus (Van Duzee, 1931) c g 
 Tachytrechus aldrichi (Van Duzee, 1929) c 
 Tachytrechus alternatus Curran, 1924 c g 
 Tachytrechus ammobates (Haliday, 1851) c g 
 Tachytrechus amnoni Grichanov, 2004 c g 
 Tachytrechus analis (Parent, 1954) c g 
 Tachytrechus angulatus (Van Duzee, 1914) i c g 
 Tachytrechus angustipennis Loew, 1862 i c g b
 Tachytrechus antennatus Van Duzee, 1930 c g 
 Tachytrechus argentatus (Aldrich, 1901) c g 
 Tachytrechus argentimanus (Van Duzee, 1929) c g 
 Tachytrechus argentipes Van Duzee, 1930 c g 
 Tachytrechus argyropus Becker, 1922 c g 
 Tachytrechus auratus (Aldrich, 1896) i c g b  
 Tachytrechus basiserratus Zhang, Yang & Grootaert, 2007 c g
 Tachytrechus beckeri Lichtwardt, 1917 
 Tachytrechus bellus (Aldrich, 1902) c g 
 Tachytrechus binodatus Loew, 1866 i c g
 Tachytrechus boliviensis Parent, 1931 c g 
 Tachytrechus bracteatus (Wiedemann, 1830) c g
 Tachytrechus brittoni Grichanov, 1998 c g 
 Tachytrechus brooksi Bickel, 2008 g
 Tachytrechus californicus (Harmston & Knowlton, 1943) i c g
 Tachytrechus callosus (Becker, 1922) c 
 Tachytrechus calyptopygeus Robinson, 1975 c g 
 Tachytrechus canacolli Brooks, 2004 c g 
 Tachytrechus castus (Wheeler, 1899) i c g 
 Tachytrechus chetiger Parent, 1920 c g 
 Tachytrechus ciliferus (Becker, 1922) c g 
 Tachytrechus clarus Parent, 1927 c g 
 Tachytrechus compositus Hollis, 1964 c g 
 Tachytrechus confusus Parent, 1931 c g 
 Tachytrechus consobrinus (Haliday, 1851) c g 
 Tachytrechus costalis (Becker, 1922) c g 
 Tachytrechus costaricensis Brooks, 2008 c g 
 Tachytrechus crassitarsis De Meijere, 1916 c g 
 Tachytrechus dilaticosta (Van Duzee, 1927) i c g 
 Tachytrechus dios Brooks, 2008 c g 
 Tachytrechus doriae Bezzi, 1925 c g 
 Tachytrechus elegans Parent, 1933 c g 
 Tachytrechus eucerus Loew, 1869 g 
 Tachytrechus excisicornis (Parent, 1930) c 
 Tachytrechus facilis (Becker, 1922) c g 
 Tachytrechus fedtschenkoi Stackelberg, 1924 c g 
 Tachytrechus femoralis (Becker, 1922) c 
 Tachytrechus flabellifer (Osten Sacken, 1877) i c g 
 Tachytrechus flavicornis Naglis, 2011 
 Tachytrechus flavitibialis (Van Duzee, 1930) i c g 
 Tachytrechus floridensis Aldrich, 1896 i c g 
 Tachytrechus frontalis (Van Duzee, 1929) c 
 Tachytrechus fuscicornis (Aldrich, 1902) c g 
 Tachytrechus fuscipennis (Van Duzee, 1931) c g 
 Tachytrechus fusiformis (Becker, 1922) c g
 Tachytrechus genualis Loew, 1857 c g
 Tachytrechus giganteus (Brooks, 2002) c g 
 Tachytrechus goudoti (Macquart, 1842)
 Tachytrechus granditarsus Greene, 1922 i c g 
 Tachytrechus greenei Foote, Coulson & Robinson, 1965 
 Tachytrechus guangxiensis Zhang, Yang & Masunaga, 2004 c g 
 Tachytrechus guanicus Curran, 1925 c g 
 Tachytrechus hamatus Loew, 1871 c g 
 Tachytrechus harmstoni Meuffels & Grootaert, 1999 c g 
 Tachytrechus humeralis (Aldrich, 1901) c g 
 Tachytrechus imperator Curran, 1927 c g 
 Tachytrechus indianus (Harmston & Knowlton, 1946) i c g 
 Tachytrechus indicus Parent, 1934 c g 
 Tachytrechus insignis (Stannius, 1831) c g
 Tachytrechus insolitus Parent, 1931 c g 
 Tachytrechus intermedius Becker, 1922 c g 
 Tachytrechus keiferi (Van Duzee, 1927) 
 Tachytrechus kenyensis Parent, 1938 c g 
 Tachytrechus kowarzi Mik, 1864 c g 
 Tachytrechus laevigatus (Becker, 1922) c g 
 Tachytrechus laticrus Van Duzee, 1918 i c g 
 Tachytrechus latifacies (Becker, 1922) c g 
 Tachytrechus latipes (Aldrich, 1896) c g 
 Tachytrechus latitarsis Becker, 1922 c g 
 Tachytrechus latitarsus (Parent, 1929)
 Tachytrechus latitibius (Van Duzee, 1929) c g 
 Tachytrechus lindneri Parent, 1933 c g 
 Tachytrechus longiciliatus (Van Duzee, 1931) c g
 Tachytrechus longifacies (Becker, 1922) c g 
 Tachytrechus luteicoxa Parent, 1929 c g 
 Tachytrechus luteifacies (Parent, 1928) c 
 Tachytrechus medinae (Philippi, 1875) c g
 Tachytrechus melaleucus Gerstaecker, 1864 c g
 Tachytrechus melanocheirus Van Duzee, 1930 c g 
 Tachytrechus melanolepis (Bezzi, 1906) c g 
 Tachytrechus mesasiaticus Stackelberg, 1934 c g 
 Tachytrechus milleri Harmston, 1966 i c g 
 Tachytrechus moechus Loew, 1861 i c g
 Tachytrechus mysticus (Becker, 1922) i c g 
 Tachytrechus nigrifemoratus (Van Duzee, 1927) i c g 
 Tachytrechus nigripes (Aldrich, 1902) c g 
 Tachytrechus nimius (Aldrich, 1901) i c g 
 Tachytrechus nitidus (Van Duzee, 1927) i c g 
 Tachytrechus notatus (Stannius, 1831)
 Tachytrechus novus Parent, 1927 c g 
 Tachytrechus obtectus Becker, 1922 c g 
 Tachytrechus ocior Loew, 1869 c g 
 Tachytrechus olympiae (Aldrich, 1896) i c g 
 Tachytrechus partitus (Van Duzee, 1929) c g 
 Tachytrechus parvicauda (Van Duzee, 1929) c g 
 Tachytrechus perornatus Robinson, 1975 c g 
 Tachytrechus peruicus Yang & Zhang, 2006 c g 
 Tachytrechus petraeus Loew, 1871 c g 
 Tachytrechus planifacies Robinson, 1975 c g 
 Tachytrechus planitarsis Becker, 1907 c g 
 Tachytrechus platypus Parent, 1931 c g 
 Tachytrechus potens (Parent, 1934) c g 
 Tachytrechus pressitibia (Parent, 1931) c g 
 Tachytrechus protervus Melander, 1900 i c g 
 Tachytrechus pteropodus Schiner, 1868 c g
 Tachytrechus ripicola Loew, 1857 c g
 Tachytrechus robustus Lichwardt, 1917 
 Tachytrechus rotundipennis Greene, 1922 i c g 
 Tachytrechus rubiginosus (Van Duzee, 1929) c g 
 Tachytrechus rubzovi Negrobov, 1976 c g 
 Tachytrechus sanus Osten Sacken, 1877 i c g b 
 Tachytrechus seriatus Robinson, 1975 c g 
 Tachytrechus setosus (Van Duzee, 1931) c g 
 Tachytrechus shannoni (Van Duzee, 1930) c g 
 Tachytrechus simplex Parent, 1926 c g 
 Tachytrechus simulatus Greene, 1922 i c g 
 Tachytrechus sinicus Stackelberg, 1925 c g 
 Tachytrechus sogdianus Loew, 1871 c g 
 Tachytrechus subcostatus (Van Duzee, 1931) c 
 Tachytrechus subpubescens (Becker, 1922) c g 
 Tachytrechus sumatranus Yang & Zhang, 2006 c g 
 Tachytrechus superbus Aldrich, 1896 c g 
 Tachytrechus tahoensis Harmston & Knowlton, 1940 i c g 
 Tachytrechus tenuiseta Greene, 1922 i c g 
 Tachytrechus tessellatus (Macquart, 1842) c g
 Tachytrechus theodori Meuffels & Grootaert, 1999 c g
 Tachytrechus transitorius Becker, 1917 c g 
 Tachytrechus transversus (Van Duzee, 1929) c 
 Tachytrechus triangularis (Aldrich, 1901) c g 
 Tachytrechus tylophorus (Schiner, 1868) c g
 Tachytrechus utahensis Harmston & Knowlton, 1940 i c g 
 Tachytrechus vanduzeei Robinson, 1975
 Tachytrechus varus (Becker, 1922) c g 
 Tachytrechus vinogradovi Stackelberg, 1971 c g 
 Tachytrechus volitans Melander, 1900 i c g 
 Tachytrechus vorax Loew, 1861 i c g b
 Tachytrechus zumbadoi Brooks, 2008 c g 

Unrecognised species:
 Tachytrechus contingens (Walker, 1852) c g

The following species were moved to Aphalacrosoma:
 Tachytrechus absarista Wei, 1998 c g 
 Tachytrechus crypsus Wei, 1998 c g 
 Tachytrechus crypsusoideus Wei, 1998 c g 
 Tachytrechus modestus Wei, 1998 c g 

The following species were moved to Paraclius:
 Tachytrechus americanus (Schiner, 1868) c g

Other synonyms:
 Tachytrechus adjaniae Gosseries, 1989: c g Synonym of Tachytrechus intermedius Becker, 1922
 Tachytrechus beckeri (Parent, 1931): c g Renamed to Tachytrechus peruicus Yang & Zhang, 2006
 Tachytrechus bipunctatus (Macquart, 1842): c g Synonym of Tachytrechus intermedius Becker, 1922
 Tachytrechus boharti Harmston, 1968 i c g: synonym of Tachytrechus sanus Osten Sacken, 1877
 Tachytrechus bolivianus Yang & Zhang, 2006: c g  Synonym of Tachytrechus theodori Meuffels & Grootaert, 1999
 Tachytrechus californicus Harmston & Knowlton, 1963: i c g  Renamed to Tachytrechus harmstoni Meuffels & Grootaert, 1999
 Tachytrechus duplicatus Harmston, 1972 i c g: synonym of Tachytrechus sanus Osten Sacken, 1877
 Tachytrechus gussakovskii Stackelberg, 1941: c g  Synonym of Tachytrechus beckeri Lichtwardt, 1917
 Tachytrechus inopinatus (Parent, 1934): c g Moved to Paraclius
 Tachytrechus mchughi Harmston, 1972 i c g: synonym of Tachytrechus sanus Osten Sacken, 1877
 Tachytrechus obscuripes Gerstaecker, 1864: c g Var. of Tachytrechus notatus (Stannius, 1831)
 Tachytrechus parenti Robinson, 1970: c g Synonym of Tachytrechus latitarsus (Parent, 1929)
 Tachytrechus pseudonotatus Yang & Zhang, 2006: c g  Synonym of Tachytrechus vanduzeei Robinson, 1975
 Tachytrechus robustus (Becker, 1922): c g Renamed to Tachytrechus theodori Meuffels & Grootaert, 1999
 Tachytrechus spinitarsis (Van Duzee, 1924): i c g Synonym of Tachytrechus sanus Osten Sacken, 1877

The following species are listed for the genus by online databases, but are actually placed in other genera:
 Tachytrechus ethiopiensis Grichanov, 2004 c g Actually in Katangaia
 Tachytrechus fumipennis (Van Duzee, 1924): c Actually in Aphrosylus
 Tachytrechus mulanjensis Grichanov, 2004 c g Actually in Katangaia
 Tachytrechus octavianus (Grichanov, 2004): c g Actually in Katangaia, synonym of Katangaia longifacies Parent, 1933
 Tachytrechus tenuipes (Van Duzee, 1924) c Actually in Aphrosylus

Data sources: i = ITIS, c = Catalogue of Life, g = GBIF, b = Bugguide.net

References

Dolichopodidae genera
Dolichopodinae
Taxa named by Alexander Henry Haliday